Claudette Hauiti (born 8 May 1961) is a New Zealand journalist, broadcaster and political commentator. She was the producer of the award winning programme Children of the Revolution. Hauiti was a New Zealand politician and member of the House of Representatives in 2013 and 2014 as a member of the National Party.

Early life
Hauiti was born on 8 May 1961 in the St Helens Hospital in Auckland. She grew up in the suburb of Mount Roskill and attended Mount Roskill Grammar School. She received a Bachelor of Arts from the Canberra College of Advanced Education. Her father died when she was 16 years old.

Broadcasting career 
In 1993 Hauiti founded Front of the Box, a television production company specialising in Māori and Pasifika programming. Through this company Hauiti was the executive producer and presenter on Eye to Eye with Willie Jackson that ran from 2004 to 2009. 

In the 2002 TV Guide NZ Television Awards she won the Best Entertainment Series award for Polyfest 2001. She also produced the documentary Children of the Revolution, which won the Best Maori Language Programme award at the 2008 Qantas Film and Television Awards.  Children of the Revolution is about protest movements New Zealand in the 1970s and 1980s, directed by Makerita Urale.  

Prior to becoming an MP, she held several high-profile roles, including deputy chair at Auckland's Museum of Transport and Technology, and strategy roles with Ngāti Te Ata and an iwi radio station.

Hauiti is a journalist for Radio Waatea and is the station's Parliamentary Press Gallery reporter.

In 2022 Hauiti was a competition judge for the Whānau Mārama: New Zealand International Film Festival.

Political career

During the 2010 Auckland local elections, Hauiti stood for the Albert-Eden Local Board in the Owairaka Subdivision. Representing Citizens & Ratepayers, she was not elected.

Hauiti stood in the  electorate during the 2011 general election representing National, losing to Labour's William Sio.

Following Aaron Gilmore's resignation, Hauiti replaced him as a list MP on 28 May 2013.

In March 2014 she returned her parliamentary charge card to Parliamentary Services, after using it to pay for a Christmas trip to Australia. In April 2014 she breached parliament rules by employing her wife as an assistant in her electorate office. She said she was unaware of the rule and immediately terminated the employment after being made aware.

Hauiti announced her resignation from politics on 22 July 2014, after having already been selected as the candidate for Kelston in the upcoming election. She was replaced by Chris Penk. She left Parliament prior to the election date to return to her private business.

Post-parliament 
In December 2014 and again in January 2015 Hauiti re-appeared in media when she was found to have spent approximately $23,000 on MP's expenses despite her known decision to stand down. 
Her second media appearance came when her sister had an employment-related dispute with Raukawa FM, a station formerly run by Hauiti as Strategic Advisor.

Personal life
Hauiti is Māori, of Ngāti Porou, Te Whānau-ā-Apanui, Ngāpuhi, Ngāti Kuta and Ngāti Ruanui descent. She is a lesbian and entered a civil union with her partner Nadine Mau in 2007. They have three children. She is a Christian.

Notes

References

1961 births
Living people
Members of the New Zealand House of Representatives
New Zealand list MPs
New Zealand National Party MPs
Unsuccessful candidates in the 2011 New Zealand general election
New Zealand television presenters
LGBT members of the Parliament of New Zealand
Lesbian politicians
Women members of the New Zealand House of Representatives
Ngāti Porou people
Te Whānau-ā-Apanui people
Ngāpuhi people
Ngāti Ruanui people
New Zealand Christians
LGBT Christians
LGBT conservatism
People educated at Mount Roskill Grammar School
University of Canterbury alumni
New Zealand Māori women
Politicians from Auckland
21st-century New Zealand politicians
21st-century New Zealand women politicians
Māori politicians
New Zealand women television presenters
21st-century LGBT people